is a Japanese ski jumper. He competed in the large hill event at the 1976 Winter Olympics.

References

1951 births
Living people
Japanese male ski jumpers
Olympic ski jumpers of Japan
Ski jumpers at the 1976 Winter Olympics
Sportspeople from Hokkaido